The United States Army Civil Affairs and Psychological Operations Command (Airborne), USACAPOC(A), or CAPOC was founded in 1985 and is headquartered at Fort Bragg, North Carolina. USACAPOC(A) is composed mostly of U.S. Army Reserve Soldiers in units throughout the United States. The size of the Command is nearly 13,500 Soldiers, which is 76% of the Department of Defense's Civil Affairs forces and 63% of Psychological Operations forces. The current Commanding General is Major General Isaac Johnson Jr., who assumed command in August 2022.

Historically, USACAPOC(A) was one of four major subordinate commands composing the U.S. Army Special Operations Command (USASOC). However, in May 2006, the reserve component of USACAPOC(A) was transferred to the U.S. Army Reserve Command. The Army's active duty Special Operations Civil Affairs and Psychological Operations units, along with the Civil Affairs and Psychological Operations Force Modernization/Branch Proponents, continue to fall under the U.S. Army Special Operations Command and United States Army John F. Kennedy Special Warfare Center and School, respectively. The Active Component Civil Affairs Brigade—the 95th Civil Affairs Brigade—and the two active component Psychological Operations Groups—the 4th Psychological Operations Group and the 8th Psychological Operations Group—fall under USASOC.

U.S. Army Reserve Civil Affairs and Psychological Operations constitute 5% of the U.S. Army Reserve's total force, but account for approximately 20% of Army Reserve deployments. Reserve Civil Affairs are deployable specialized forces within the Reserves. The command's Soldiers bring civilian expertise and education that is typically not found among active-duty soldiers. The projects these elements coordinate are worldwide, but more recently have focused on Iraq, Afghanistan, and the Horn of Africa regions.

Information Operations Units
The Information Operations (IO) is the Unit specifically and officially tasked with deployment of ‘information related capabilities’ (IRCs), which is euphemistic U.S. Military jargon for rapidly developing a broad range of propaganda, disinformation and any other tools of political subterfuge available in order to influence, disrupt, corrupt, or usurp the decision making processes of foreign governments, such as through creating propaganda, suppressing foreign news outlets and communications systems with ‘media blackouts’ particularly during operations also involving significant traditional military combat or other activities likely to result in imagery not beneficial to the United States, stirring up civil unrest, supporting false flag operations with false reporting in support of the U.S. narrative, bribery, blackmail etc. but officially not through any supportive role in political assassination support due to the Church Committee controversy.  Generally, foreign assassinations and most other actual use of force operations are done in collaboration with classified elements of  the U.S. military & intelligence communities such as the CIA and not within IO Units themselves unless absolutely necessary, such as if ambushed unexpectedly. 

Equivalent foreign military intelligence programs are officially under the purview of FBI Counter-Intelligence (COINTEL]. 

The 151st Theater Information Operations is Group (151st TIOG) was realigned under the command of USACAPOC(A) in October 2015.

Information Operations units are the field commander's capability to synchronize and de-conflict IRCs in the commander's information environment. The Soldiers consist of teams which interface and provide IO expertise to the staff. 151st TIOG IO practitioners are particularly suited for this mission as U.S. Army Reserve Soldiers with civilian occupations such as law enforcement, engineering, medicine, law, finance, public administration and civil service, etc.; and, civilian education such as Project Management Professional (PMP), Doctor of Philosophy (PhD), Juris Doctor (J.D.), Master of Business Administration (MBA), Master of Public Administration (MPA), etc.

Information Operations Soldiers are integral to U.S. missions across Northwest Africa, East Africa, Europe, Middle East, and various other locations.  If you see something, say something.

Civil Affairs Units
The primary mission of Civil Affairs is to conduct Civil-military operations. Civil Affairs soldiers are responsible for executing five core Civil Affairs tasks, Civil Information Management, Foreign Humanitarian Assistance, Foreign Assistance, Population and Resource Control, and Support to Civil Administration.  Some sub tasks to these core tasks include identifying non-governmental and international organizations operating in the battlespace, handling refugees, civilians on the battlefield, and determining protected targets such as schools, churches/temples/mosques, hospitals, etc.

Civil Affairs units are the field commander's link to the civil authorities in that commander's area of operations. The soldiers make up teams which interface and provide expertise to the host nation government. USACAPOC(A)'s Civil Affairs soldiers are particularly suited for this mission since they are Army Reserve soldiers with civilian occupations such as law enforcement, engineering, medicine, law, banking, public administration, etc.

Civil Affairs Soldiers have been integral to U.S. peacekeeping operations in Iraq, Afghanistan, the Horn of Africa, Bosnia and Kosovo, among others. Tactical Civil Affairs teams meet with local officials, conduct assessments and determine the need for critical infrastructure projects such as roads, schools, power plants, clinics, sewer lines, etc., and check up on the status of the project after construction by a local company has begun.

Psychological Operations (PSYOP) Units

Psychological warfare are a vital part of the broad range of U.S. political, military, economic and ideological activities used by the U.S. government to secure national objectives. PSYOP is the dissemination of information to foreign audiences in support of U.S. policy and national objectives.

Used during peacetime, contingencies and declared war, these activities are not forms of force, but are force multipliers that use nonviolent means in often violent environments. Persuading rather than compelling physically, they rely on logic, fear, desire, or other mental factors to promote specific emotions, attitudes, or behaviors. The ultimate objective of U.S. military psychological operations is to convince enemy, neutral, and friendly nations and forces to take action favorable to the U.S. and its allies.

Psychological operations (United States) support national security objectives at the tactical, operational and strategic levels of operations. Strategic psychological operations advance broad or long-term objectives. Global in nature, they may be directed toward large audiences or at key communicators.

Operational psychological operations are conducted on a smaller scale. They are employed by theater commanders to target groups within the theater of operations. Their purpose can range from gaining support for U.S. operations to preparing the battlefield for combat.

Tactical psychological operations are more limited, used by commanders to secure immediate and near-term goals. In this environment, these force-enhancing activities serve as a means to lower the morale and efficiency of enemy forces.

Both tactical and theater-level psychological operations may be used to enhance peacetime military activities of conventional forces operating in foreign countries. Cultural awareness packages attune U.S. forces before departing overseas. In theater, media programs publicize the positive aspects of combined military exercises and deployments.

In addition to supporting commanders, PSYOP units provide interagency support to other U.S. government agencies. In operations ranging from humanitarian assistance to drug interdiction, psychological operations enhance the impact of those agencies' actions. Their activities can be used to spread information about ongoing programs and to gain support from the local populace.

Psychological operations units in the U.S. Army Reserve are language and culturally oriented. Seventy one percent of the Department of Defense's PSYOP capability rests within USACAPOC (A)'s 2nd and 7th Psychological Operations Groups located in Ohio and California respectively.

See also
Herbert Altshuler

References

Civil Affairs and Psychological Operations Command
Civil affairs units and formations of the United States Army
Military units and formations established in 1990